Man Jali is a 2012 Pakistani television family drama series aired on Geo Entertainment from 6 June 2012. It is produced by Shahzad Nasib and Samina Humayun Saeed. It stars Mehwish Hayat, Mikaal Zulfikaar, Saba Hameed and Sajid Hassan in lead roles.

Plot 
The plot revolves around Tooba, a free-spirited and free willed girl who loves her cousin Ramis but circumstances constrain her to marry Junaid, not a good guy. On the other hand, it also revolves around Wahab Ahmed who portrays himself as a pious man but involved in illegal dealings such as corruption.

Cast
Mehwish Hayat as Tooba Wahab
Mikaal Zulfiqar as Taimoor Mirza
Saba Hameed as Zareena Wahab
Sajid Hassan as Wahab Ahmed
Natasha Ali as Maina
Shehryar Zaidi
Sohai Ali Abro as Sania
Faris Shafi as Ramis
Shamim Hilaly

Reception
Man Jali received positive reviews from the audience for its dialogues and script. The viewers appreciated Hayat's performance and  made her gain recognition.

Awards and nominations

References

External links
 Man Jali-Har Pal Geo

2012 Pakistani television series debuts
Urdu-language television shows
Geo TV original programming